TiE Silicon Valley (TiE SV) is the largest and founding chapter of the TiE brand, a non-profit organization dedicated to fostering entrepreneurship. The chapter provides technology entrepreneurs with mentoring services, networking opportunities, startup-related education, funding, and incubating.

History
TiE SV was founded in 1992 by a group of entrepreneurs, corporate executives, and senior professionals with roots in the South Asian or Indus region and was named TiE for "The Indus Entrepreneurs." It has since moved away from that focus and is open and inclusive.

TiE SV received the 2014 Innovation Catalyst Award by VC Taskforce, which recognizes venture community leaders for being catalysts of innovation and entrepreneurship.

Organization
TiE SV is a network of general members, Charter Members, and sponsors. Charter members are veteran entrepreneurs who assist younger entrepreneurs by offering their time, knowledge, and resources. This membership level is by invitation only.

Programs

TiEcon
TiEcon is TiE SV's flagship annual conference. Since 2008, more than 4,000 people attend the conference from over 40 countries. It is widely considered the world's largest conference for entrepreneurs. The conference features two full days of networking and programming with thousands of entrepreneurs, venture capitalists, industry executives, and thought leaders.

Each TiEcon, the world's 50 most promising technology startups are honored as the "TiE50." These companies are selected from more than 1,600 companies screened worldwide. As of 2011, 94% of TiE50 companies had been funded, attracted over $20 billion in investments, and 42 of the companies exited. At TiEcon 2011, Cloudera, the leading provider of Apache Hadoop-based data management software and services, was announced as a TiE50 winner in the software/cloud computing category.

TiEcon was listed by Worth Magazine in their September 2011 issue to be among the 10 Best Conferences for Ideas and Entrepreneurship.

TiE Angels
TiE Angels is an early stage Angel investment group formed in 2010 by Charter Members of TiE SV. There are about 100 investors that invest through TiE Angels. There is no TiE SV fund and individuals invest in their personal capacity. TiE Angels was ranked by CB Insights as one of the Top 20 Angel groups in the nation in August 2014.

Most of TiE Angels investments are under $1 million, with a focus on enterprise solutions that leverage the technological expertise of TiE members. In its first year of existence, TiE Angels invested in 11 companies with a total of about $4.5 million. CloudVolumes, which was purchased by VMware in August 2014, was backed by TiE Angels and several individual Angel investors. TiE Angels also backed CRISI Medical which was acquired by BD Medical in March 2015.

TiE LaunchPad
TiE LaunchPad is TiE SV's accelerator program for early stage startups. LaunchPad accepts eight companies per batch, and startups are seeded with $50,000 in convertible notes and offered optional working space, infrastructure, and additional support services for a five month duration. Companies also get assistance in fundraising by presenting to TiE's network of investors at a Demo Day at the end of the program. More than 50 Charter members serve as mentors to LaunchPad companies.

Billion Dollar Babies
The Billion Dollar Babies Program is an initiative through TiE SV to mentor product companies out of India who are achieving significant domestic traction and wish to scale their products globally. It is managed by BV Jagadeesh, Raju Reddy (founder of Sierra Atlantic), and TiE SV President Venktesh Shukla. The pilot round of this program began January 2015.

References

Entrepreneurship organizations
Technology organizations
Non-profit organizations based in California